The Grape Street Watts Crips is a Crip subset based in the Watts neighborhood of Los Angeles. The gang's rivalry with the Bounty Hunter Bloods has been described as being "the most violent and long lasting feud between two gangs that are in the Watts area."

History

Brandon "BL" Bullard, a veteran of the Grape Street Watts Crips, was murdered by the East Coast Crips in 2008. The murder of Bullard sparked a war that resulted in 26 wounded and 9 dead in the six weeks that followed.

Media appearances 
Members of the Grape Street Watts Crips appeared in the documentary Crips and Bloods: Made in America, directed by Stacy Peralta.

See also
 Jordan Downs

References

Further reading
 
 
 
Watts Beset by Retaliatory Shootings. Los Angeles Times.

External links 
FBI Charges Grape Street Crips

Organizations established in the 1970s
1970s establishments in California
Crips subgroups
African-American organized crime
Watts, Los Angeles